On 27 March 1999, during the NATO bombing of Yugoslavia, a Yugoslav Army unit (the 3rd Battalion of the 250th Air Defense Missile Brigade, which was under the leadership of Colonel Zoltán Dani) shot down an F-117 Nighthawk stealth aircraft of the United States Air Force by firing a S-125 Neva/Pechora surface-to-air missile. The pilot ejected safely and was rescued by U.S. Air Force PJs conducting search and rescue.

The F-117, which entered service with the U.S. Air Force in 1983, was cutting-edge equipment, and the first operational aircraft to be designed using stealth technology; by comparison, the Yugoslav air defenses were considered relatively obsolete.

In 2020, an F-117A pilot, during an interview in which he also reminded all that the F-117A was "low observable, not invisible", stated that his wingman's F-117A had been damaged by a Yugoslav surface-to-air missile some time after the 27 March incident, but that it managed to return to base. Some reports suggest that this second incident was also committed by the 3rd battery of the 250th Air Defense Missile Brigade, the same SAM battery that shot down the first F-117.

Downing
On 27 March 1999, the 3rd Battalion of the 250th Air Defense Missile Brigade of the Army of Yugoslavia, under the command of Lt. Colonel (later Colonel) Zoltán Dani, downed F-117 Air Force serial number 82-0806, callsign "Vega 31".

The Army of Yugoslavia unit was equipped with a Yugoslav version of the Soviet Isayev S-125 "Neva" missile system (NATO reporting name, SA-3 "Goa").

At about 8:15p.m. local time, with a range of about  several missiles were launched. According to Lieutenant Colonel Đorđe Aničić, who was identified in 2009 as the soldier who fired the missiles, they detected the F-117 at a range of about 23 km operating their equipment for no more than 17 seconds to avoid being locked on to by NATO anti-air suppression.

The F-117, callsign "Vega-31", was being flown by Lt. Col. Darrell Patrick "Dale" Zelko (born 1 January 1960), an Operation Desert Storm veteran. He observed the two missiles punch through the low cloud cover and head straight for his aircraft. The first passed over him, close enough to cause buffeting, but did not detonate. The second missile detonated nearby, its shrapnel and shockwave causing significant damage to the aircraft and causing it to tumble out of control. The explosion was large enough to be seen from a KC-135 Stratotanker flying over Bosnia.

Zelko was subject to intense g-forces as the aircraft tumbled and had great difficulty in assuming the correct posture for ejecting. After his parachute deployed, he used his survival radio to issue a mayday call and was able to contact the KC-135 that had seen him become shot down. Zelko used his survival radio while still descending although this was contrary to his training. He reasoned the altitude would give his signal the best possible range and was also sure he would be quickly taken prisoner by Yugoslav forces on the ground and wanted to confirm he was unhurt before this happened.

Zelko landed in a field south of Ruma and around a mile south of a four-lane highway, European route E70. He quickly concealed himself in a drainage ditch that he had identified as a hole-up site while descending. There, he felt the shock waves of bombs dropped by NATO B-2 bombers on targets on the outskirts of Belgrade. Zelko landed around a mile from his aircraft's crash site, and an intensive search of the area was carried out by the Yugoslav soldiers, policemen, and local villagers. At one point, searchers came within a few hundred meters of the ditch he was hiding in. Zelko was rescued approximately eight hours later by a U.S. Air Force combat search and rescue team flying in a Sikorsky MH-53 helicopter in the early hours of the next morning. According to Zelko, he would later learn that he had been minutes away from being captured. He was initially misidentified in press reports, as the name "Capt Ken 'Wiz' Dwelle" was painted on the aircraft's canopy. The lost F-117 carried the name "Something Wicked" and had previously flown 39 sorties during the Persian Gulf War's Operation Desert Storm.

On 2 May 1999, the 250th Air Defense Missile Brigade also shot down a USAF F-16 fighter piloted by future Chief of Staff of the United States Air Force David L. Goldfein.

Aftermath
Photographs show that the aircraft struck the ground at low speed in an inverted position, and that the airframe remained relatively intact. The United States did not attempt to destroy the wreckage, surprising analysts and pilots. The F-117 was based on 1970s technology, the military had revealed its existence in 1988, and the aircraft often appeared at air shows. General Bruce A. Carlson stated that if Serbia gave the wreckage to Russia, the result would be minimal.

Some pieces of the F-117's wreckage are preserved at the Serbian Museum of Aviation in Belgrade. A small rubber part of the plane was shown as "a souvenir" to Western journalists by Serbian warlord Arkan during the NATO air campaign. The USAF retired its F-117s in 2008.

Zoltán Dani, now running a bakery, and Dale Zelko, now retired from the U.S. Air Force, met in 2011. They have since developed a friendship.

In 2020, an F-117A pilot claimed that his wingman's F-117A had been damaged by a Yugoslav surface-to-air missile after the 27 March 1999 incident, but it managed to return to base. This incident remains classified and only some details were revealed.

Gallery

References

External links

 Vega 31: The Loss of #806
 Russians admit testing F-117 lost in Yugoslavia, 2001 Flight Global article
 

1999 in the United States
1999 in Yugoslavia
Aviation accidents and incidents in 1999
March 1999 events in Europe
20th-century aircraft shootdown incidents
20th-century history of the United States Air Force
Accidents and incidents involving United States Air Force aircraft
Aerial operations and battles of the Kosovo War
Aviation accidents and incidents in Yugoslavia